Fio or FIO may refer to:
 Fio Zanotti (born 1949), Italian record producer
 FIO (software), the flexible IO tester created by Jens Axboe
 Florida Institute of Oceanography
 Fraction of inspired oxygen
 Flexible IO
 National Federation Of Industrial Organisations, former Japanese trade union federation
 Pemoline, a stimulant
 The East Slavic name format of family name, given name and patronymic ( – ФИО)
 Free In and Out, maritime freight rate term

See also 
 Fiio